Mazo is a Spanish language surname, which may be an occupational surname for a person who used a mallet, or mazo in Spanish. Mazo may also be a locational surname for a person from one of the places called Mazo in Spain. The name may refer to:

Alec Mazo (born 1978), American television producer
Alejandro del Mazo (born 1980), Mexican politician 
Alfredo del Mazo González (1943–2019), Mexican politician
Alfredo del Mazo Maza (born 1975), Mexican politician
Alfredo del Mazo Vélez (1904–1975), Mexican politician
Earl Mazo (1919–2007), American journalist
Gerardo del Mazo Morales (born 1976), Mexican politician
José Ricardo Mazó (1927–1987), Paraguayan poet
Juan Bautista Martínez del Mazo (1612–1667), Spanish painter
Margarita del Mazo (born 1960), Spanish writer
Michael Mazo, Canadian filmmaker
Phil Mazo (born 1981), American comedian
Santiago José García Mazo (1768–1849), Spanish writer

See also 

 Mazo (disambiguation)
 Mazzo (surname)

References

Spanish-language surnames